Limelight is a 2011 documentary film that charts the rise and fall of New York City club king Peter Gatien. Produced by Gatien's daughter, Jen Gatien, it was released in special markets throughout the United States and Canada on September 23, 2011.

Synopsis
As the owner of legendary New York City hotspots like The Limelight, Tunnel, Palladium, and Club USA, Peter Gatien was considered by many to be the undisputed king of the 1980s New York City club scene. The Ontario native, whose trademark eye patch made him stand out in a crowd, built and oversaw a chain of nightclub ventures that brought thousands of patrons per night during its peak years. However, after years of legal battles and police pressure spearheaded by Mayor Rudolph Giuliani's drive to crack down on the city's nightlife scene during the mid-1990s, Gatien was deported to Canada, bringing an end to his presence and influence in the city's nightlife scene. The documentary features interviews with numerous people involved in the club's scene, as well as key informants in Gatien's high-profile trial. Produced by Gatien's daughter, Jen, and Alfred Spellman, and directed by Billy Corben (who previously directed the film Cocaine Cowboys), the film documents the rise and fall of Gatien and his nightclub empire.

Featured interviews
 Peter Gatien
 Michael Alig
 Ed Koch
 Howard Safir

Distribution
Limelight premiered on April 22 at the 2011 Tribeca Film Festival. World distribution rights were acquired by Magnolia Pictures prior to the Tribeca premiere.

Feature film adaptation
On April 12, 2018, Alfonso Gomez-Rejon is set to direct the feature film adaptation of Limelight, with Nicholas Pileggi and JJ Sacha writing the script, Jen Gatien & Christopher Donnelly will produce the film and Amazon Studios will distribute the film adaptation.

References

External links
 
 
 
 
 

2011 films
American documentary films
Documentary films about businesspeople
Films about drugs
Documentary films about drugs
Cultural history of New York City
Nightlife
2011 documentary films
Club Kids
Nightlife in New York City
Films shot in New York City
Documentary films about New York City
Films directed by Billy Corben
2010s English-language films
2010s American films